St. Elizabeth Catholic High School is a high school in Thornhill, Ontario, Canada. St. Elizabeth CHS was founded by the York Catholic District School Board in 1987, celebrating its 20th anniversary in 2007. St. Elizabeth is the home of Regional Arts Program for drama, dance, visual arts, and music students in York Region. The enrollment averages between 1300 and 1500 students per school year.

In the beginning, St. Elizabeth consisted of (and was only open to) grade nine students. However, the school added the tenth grade for the 1988–1989 school year and the eleventh grade for the remainder of 1989. Due to the overpopulation of school enrollment, a change of site was announced and the current location began construction in 1988. Once completed in January 1990, it was officially opened to students and staff in February 1990. The high school's original location (at 21 Mullen Drive in Thornhill) was changed to Holy Family Catholic School, and officially opened in September 1990.

Feeder schools
Blessed Scalabrini (Bishop Scalabrini)
Our Lady of the Rosary
Father John Kelly
Our Lady of Peace
St. Joseph the Worker
Blessed Trinity
St. Cecilia

Notable alumni

Paula Brancati – actress
Luke Bilyk – actor

See also
List of high schools in Ontario

References

External links
St. Elizabeth Catholic High School

York Catholic District School Board
High schools in the Regional Municipality of York
Education in Vaughan
Catholic secondary schools in Ontario
Educational institutions established in 1987
1987 establishments in Ontario
Art schools in Canada